Uncertain Glory is a 1944 war crime drama film, directed by Raoul Walsh and starring Errol Flynn and Paul Lukas.

Walsh later called the movie a "quickie". François Truffaut admired the film.

The title is a reference to a line from Shakespeare's play Two Gentlemen of Verona (Act 1, Scene 3): "O, how this spring of love resembleth/ The uncertain glory of an April day,/ Which now shows all the beauty of the sun,/ And by and by a cloud takes all away!"

Plot
In Vichy Paris of World War II, career criminal Jean Picard (Errol Flynn) awaits execution. French Sûreté Inspector Marcel Bonet (Paul Lukas) has followed Picard for 15 years, apprehending him this final time for murder.

An air raid delivers a direct hit to the prison when Picard is at the guillotine. He flees to the apartment of his best friend, Henri Duval (Sheldon Leonard), unsubtly threatening exposure to the police in return for forged papers and 5,000 francs.  While Duval is gone Picard seduces his willing girlfriend, Faye Emerson.  In return, Duval rats on Picard to the Sûreté.

Bonet tracks Picard to a hotel room in Bordeaux, taking him at gunpoint. Their trip back to Paris is delayed en route by a bridge being out, blown the night before while carrying a German troop train by an unknown saboteur. 100 Frenchmen held hostage by the Gestapo, 25 culled from the local village, will be executed in five days unless the perpetrator is found. Thinking he can use his wiles to elude Bonet, Picard offers to give himself up as responsible to evade the guillotine in favor of a "more respectable" German firing squad.

Extremely skeptical, Bonet nonetheless agrees, and prepares Picard for interrogation by going to view the bridge site together and drilling him in canned answers, as the Germans must be confident he is the real saboteur and not just a martyr or crackpot.

To evade suspicious authorities Picard - now going by the name Jean Emil Dupont - duck into a shop, where Jean is immediately taken with the attractive young innocent behind its counter, Marianne ( Jean Sullivan ).  She is a ward of its owner, Mme. Maret, whose son is one of the hostages.  Three days remain till the executions.

While Jean works Bonet for some time to dally with Maryanne before turning himself in, Mme. Maret continues her effort to find a fall guy to hand to the Germans in return for the freedom of her son and the rest of the men being held. Her first pigeon, Brenoir (Joel Friedkin), proved too cowardly to sacrifice himself as a scapegoat.

In order to put an end to "Picard" and leave the path clear for their gambit, Bonet sends word to his superiors in Paris that he had to shoot the escapee in flight, with his body washing down a river unretrieved.

Evidence gathered by the local gendarmes suggests three men were in the sabotage party.  Noting two strangers in town who had not reported to submit their identification papers, its commander leads a detail to Bonet's hotel room, bringing a captured suspect and seeking to arrest the two others for the crime.

Thinking fast, Jean reveals Bonet's real identity to the police commander, giving Bonet a chance to claim both Jean and the captured man are both with the Sûreté as part of its undercover effort to capture the fugitive.  Released, the "team" of Bonet and Dupont discover the man to be  Major Andre Varenne (Ivan Triesault) of the Free French Army, and aid him in his air evacuation back to England.

The next morning Jean frees himself from his handcuff and leaves a flu-ridden Bonet behind to make his rendezvous with Maryanne after Sunday mass.  He has once again convinced Bonet to trust him.  Instead, he plans to use a picnic with the guileless young girl - whom he has grown quite fond of - as a guise to show him an unguarded way out of town.  

Meanwhile, the local priest, Father LeClerc (Dennis Hoey), discovers a second plot by Mme. Maret, this time seeking to get three local men to frame the "innocent" Monsieur DuPont for destroying the bridge.  He rails that it would be murder, and swears God's wrath upon any who dare take justice into their own hands.

Bonet's illness worsens and he is confined to bed.  This time Jean uses the ruse of wanting to have the priest hear his confession before turning himself in to be allowed to leave on his own.  Instead, he joins up with Maryanne, who helps him evade a mob of locals once again incited by Mme. Maret into turning Jean in.  Again Father LeClerc quells the uprising.

When Jean announces he is leaving for Paris Maryanne pleas to accompany him.  He seeks to dissuade her with a confession that he is an unreliable and disreputable character.  She is undaunted, and he takes her along.

By morning they are clopping along in a farmer’s wagon. The old man offers breakfast. Afterwards, while he and his wife join with their hands outside to say prayers for the hostages, Marianne lights a candle for their son, as he too will die. One more time Jean is cornered by the tragedy he had promised to avert, and an ever-growing flicker of conscience he cannot ignore.

Promising Maryanne he will go on his own to Paris to get money from friends there for the two of them to flee to a new life together in Martinique, he leaves her behind.

Back in Paris that evening, Bonet is desperate.  He knows he cannot tell the truth of what he has conspired to allow with his once-prisoner; it will ruin his career and shame his family.  He resolves to turn himself in to the Gestapo as the saboteur.  As he stands to leave, in walks Jean, ready to do so himself, asking only that Bonet retrieve Maryanne from her futile vigil.

Jean successfully convinces the Nazis he was the sole saboteur.  Six bullets await him.  Bonet goes to Maryanne, who is heartbroken and confused that her Jean did not return.  In tears, she asks Bonet, ”You were his friend, you knew him well. What is he really like, deep in his heart?” Bonet pauses for dramatic effect, and answers not her but a wartime movie audience: “He was a Frenchman.”

Cast

 Errol Flynn as Jean Picard
 Paul Lukas as Inspector Marcel Bonet
 Jean Sullivan as Marianne
 Lucile Watson as Mme. Maret
 Dennis Hoey as Father Le Clerc
 Albert Van Antwerp as Vitrac, an undergrounder
 Wallis Clark as Razeau, an undergrounder
 Victor Kilian as Latour, an undergrounder
 James Flavin as Captain, Mobile Guard
 Douglass Dumbrille as Police Commissioner LaFarge
 Art Smith as The Warden
 Faye Emerson as Louise
 Sheldon Leonard as Henri Duval
 Odette Myrtil as Mme. Bonet
 Ivan Triesault as Maj. Andre Varenne, the saboteur
 Bobby Walberg as Gaston Bonet
 Francis Pierlot as Prison Chaplain 
 Pedro de Cordoba as Executioner (bit) 
 Fred Cordova as Execution Guard (extra)

Production
In September 1942 it was announced that Flynn had signed a new contract with Warners for four films a year, one of which he was to also produce. This was the first film produced under Flynn's new contract with Warners which allowed him a say in the choice of vehicle, director and cast, plus a portion of the profits. He formed his own company, Thomson Productions, to make Uncertain Glory and planned to make a series of films with director Raoul Walsh.

Warners announced the film in June 1943. Flynn was assigned to it instead of Singing in the Wood, where he would have played John James Audubon, the naturalist. That month Robert Buckner was assigned to produce.

Max Brand reportedly worked on the script.

Paul Lukas, who had just had a big hit with Watch on the Rhine, was attached in July 1943. Faye Emerson and Jean Sullivan were signed to support.

Shooting
Principal photography on Uncertain Glory started in August 1943. During filming it was announced Warners would rush release plans on this and Passage to Marseilles, another drama set in occupied France.

Some filming took place in the grape country in Escondido. While shooting there, labor-strapped farm hands insisted the unit had to pick grapes with them before they would allow filming to take place.

Reception
A contemporary The Washington Post reviewer wrote "Flynn has never given a more restrained, earnest and believable portrayal ... there is guile, sly humour, an appealing bravado, grim rebellion, gentleness, charm, in his drawing of a character that is alternately enigmatic and transparent. Mr Flynn is more of an actor than many have thought."

In 2019 Filmink magazine said "The story gets off to a terrific start" but that "about a third of the way in, it all goes haywire."

Selected clip 
Jean Picard (Errol Flynn), Inspector Marcel Bonet (Paul Lukas)

References

Bibliography

 Behlmer, Rudy. Inside Warner Brothers, 1935-51.  London: Weidenfeld & Nicolson, 1987. .
 Thomas, Tony, Rudy Behlmer and Clifford McCarty. The Films of Errol Flynn. New York: Citadel Press, 1969. .

External links
 
 
 
 
 Review of film at Variety

1944 films
American black-and-white films
Films directed by Raoul Walsh
World War II films made in wartime
Films about capital punishment
Films about the French Resistance
Films scored by Adolph Deutsch
American crime drama films
1944 crime drama films
Warner Bros. films
1940s English-language films